Dorofk-e Sofla (also Romanized as Dorofk-e Soflá; also known as Dorofk-e Pā’īn and Dorofk) is a village in Tabas Rural District, in the Central District of Khoshab County, Razavi Khorasan Province, Iran. At the 2006 census, its population was 237, in 85 families.

Much of Dorofk's population migrated to Tehran and Bumehen.

References 

Populated places in Khoshab County